Ramón Ponce Contreras (born 25 February 1956) is a Mexican politician from the National Action Party. From 2000 to 2003 he served as Deputy of the LVIII Legislature of the Mexican Congress representing Michoacán.

References

1956 births
Living people
People from Apatzingán
Politicians from Michoacán
National Action Party (Mexico) politicians
21st-century Mexican politicians
Deputies of the LVIII Legislature of Mexico
Members of the Chamber of Deputies (Mexico) for Michoacán